This is a list of Western Kentucky University Hilltoppers football players in the NFL Draft.

Key

Selections

References

WKU

Western Kentucky Hilltoppers NFL Draft